Austromuellera valida is a species of rainforest tree in the protea family that is endemic to north-eastern Queensland, Australia. It was first formally described by Bernard Hyland in 1999 in the series Flora of Australia (Vol.17B, Proteaceae).

Description
The leaves are mostly simple, sometimes lobed, the blades 7–10 cm long by 5.5–8 cm wide, with 5.5–9 cm petioles. Young shoots are densely covered with rust-brown hairs. The flowers are borne on racemes 17–30 cm long. The fruits are 10–15 cm long.

Distribution and habitat
The range of the species is restricted to montane rainforest in the Mount Spurgeon, Mount Lewis and Pinnacle Rock area west of Mossman, with an altitudinal range of 1,000–1,200 m.

References

valida
Flora of Queensland
Endemic flora of Australia
Proteales of Australia
Taxa named by Bernard Hyland
Plants described in 1999